Sika Foyer (born 1968) is a Togolese American mixed media and conceptual visual artist and curator living and working in New York City.
In 2017 she curated the exhibition Affirmative Art at Nagenda International Academy of Art and Design (NIAAD) at Makerere University in Namulanda, Entebbe, Uganda.  In 2021 she received her Master of Fine Arts from Lesley University in Cambridge, Massachusetts.

Many of her recent works center upon tbe concept of wrapping. in 2021 Her work was the subject of a solo exhibition Mara River Crossing at the Soloway Gallery in Brooklyn, New York. The same year her work was shown in a group exhibition of seven contemporary black artists Legacy and Rupture at the City Gallery in New Haven, Connecticut.

References

People from Lomé
Living people
Togolese artists
Lesley University alumni
1968 births
Togolese curators
Togolese women curators